Old Woman Run is a stream in the U.S. state of West Virginia.

Old Woman Run was named after "Old Woman", a bear lived in the nearby woods until she was killed by a local hunter.

See also
List of rivers of West Virginia

References

Rivers of Braxton County, West Virginia
Rivers of West Virginia